In the Strand of Zayandeh Rud is an Iranian Drama series. The series is directed by Hassan Fathi.

Storyline 
A young football player named Mehran Sarang is going to Isfahan to sign a contract with an Isfahanian club (F.C.) and inadvertently kills a young Isfahan named Masoud Mosayeb, a cultural activist, in an accident. The story continues in this incident that...

Cast 
 Ashkan Khatibi
 Mehdi Soltani
 Masoud Rayegan
 Behnoosh Tabatabaei
 Mehraneh Mahin Torabi
 Hooman Barghnavard
 Mehran Nael
 Hamid Reza Azarang
 Afsaneh Pakroo
 Hossein Mahjoub
 Hossein Azarbara
 Mehdi Bagherbeigi
 Mehrdad Ziaei
 Pardis Afkari
 Azadeh Riazi
 Nima Naderi
 Shahrzad yazdani
 Behnaz Naderi
 Elaheh Hosseini

In some parts of this series, the following football players appeared as guest actors:
 Karim Bagheri
 Arash Borhani
 Vahid Shamsaei
 Esmaeil Farhadi
 Mohammad Salsali
 Farshid Talebi
 Ahmad Jamshidian
 Mehdi Jafarpour

References

External links
 

2010s Iranian television series
Iranian television series